Simo Drljača (6 August 1947 – 10 July 1997) was a Bosnian Serb police chief and indicted war criminal. Drljača was chief of the Public Security Station for Prijedor.

References

1947 births
1997 deaths
People from Sanski Most
Serbs of Bosnia and Herzegovina
Assassinated Serbian people
People indicted by the International Criminal Tribunal for the former Yugoslavia